Sadras is a fortress town located on India's Coromandel Coast in Chengalpattu district, 70 km south of Chennai in Tamil Nadu state. Sadras is the anglicised form of the ancient town of Saduranga pattinam.

History and Etymology
An inscription found in Sadras dated to 1359 mention this place as Rajanarayanan Pattinam after a Sambuvaraya chieftain. There is a temple to Vishnu here, and because of it later the city was known as Sadiravasagan Pattinam. This later changed into Sadurangapattinam, shortly known as Sadirai. Later the Dutch called it Sadras.

Dutch Fort

Modern Sadras was established as part of Dutch Coromandel in the seventeenth century, which was even before center for weaving superfine muslin cloth for export besides Pearl and edible oil. The magnificent Sadras Fort, built for commercial purposes by the Dutch, is a vast compound enclosing a huge granary, stables, and structures used to mount elephants. Unfortunately, only one of these structures survives. The fortress was raided by the British in 1818 and came under the control of the British East India Company. It is now maintained by the Archaeological Survey of India in efforts to contain further dilapidation. In 2003, a major restoration of the damaged fort was carried out leading to many archaeological findings. The first battle between British East India Company and the Dutch started here as Battle of Sadras. The fort includes a cemetery with many beautifully decorated graves that date to between 1620 and 1769.

Location
In recent times, Sadras has found mention due to its proximity to the atomic power plant (Madras Atomic Power Station) and the atomic research centre (Indira Gandhi Centre for Atomic Research – IGCAR) both located at nearby Kalpakkam. The village of Sadras is sandwiched between the power plant and its township. There are two bridges connecting Kalpakkam and Sadras.

Gallery
The Sadras Fort also contains picturesque tombs.

References

External links

About sadras

A Travelogue with photos

Cities and towns in Kanchipuram district
Forts in Tamil Nadu
Coromandel Coast
Dutch Coromandel
Populated coastal places in India